Hans Schinz (6 December 1858 – 30 October 1941) was a Swiss explorer and botanist who was a native of Zürich.

In 1884 he participated in an exploratory expedition to German Southwest Africa that was organized by German merchant Adolf Lüderitz (1834–1886). For the next few years Schinz undertook extensive scientific studies of the northern parts of the colony. As a result of the expedition, he published Deutsch-Südwestafrika, Forschungsreisen durch die deutschen Schutzgebiete Groß- Nama- und Hereroland, nach dem Kunene, dem Ngamisee und Kalahari884-1887 (German South West Africa: Research Expedition of Herero and Nama Country, the Kunene Region, Lake Ngami and the Kalahari; 1884–1887). This work was an important scientific, geographic and ethnographic study of the colony, and was one of the first comprehensive works on the Ovamboland region. It was during this expedition that he made the acquaintance of the Finnish missionary Martti Rautanen (1845–1926) at Olukonda, and named the tree Ricinodendron rautanenii after him.

In 1889 he received his habilitation at Zürich, where in 1895 he became a professor and director of the botanical gardens.
With Robert Keller (1854–1939), he was the author of Flora der Schweiz, a work on Swiss flora that published over several editions from 1900 to 1923.

Several taxa have been named in his honour;
In 1889, Swiss botanist Victor Fayod published Schinzinia, which is a fungal genus in the family Agaricaceae. Also in 1889, Melioschinzia (in the Meliaceae family), was published by K.Schum., this genus is now a synonym of Chisocheton. Schinzafra (in Bruniaceae family) was published by Kuntze in 1891, this genus is now a synonym of Thamnea. Then in 1895, botanist Ernst Friedrich Gilg published Schinziella, a monotypic genus of flowering plants from Africa, belonging to the family Gentianaceae. Lastly, from the Euphorbiaceae family, Schinziophyton was published in Kew Bull. 45: 157 (in 1990) by Hutch. ex Radcl.Sm.

See also 
 Johann Christian Friedrich Heidmann

Notes

References 
 Biographies of Namibian Personalities by Klaus Dierks

External links
 

Swiss explorers
Swiss taxonomists
1858 births
1941 deaths
Academic staff of the University of Zurich
Swiss Protestants
19th-century Swiss botanists
20th-century Swiss botanists